B8 road often known as the Golden Highway  is one of the national highways of Namibia. It leads from the B1 at Otavi via Grootfontein and Rundu through the Caprivi Strip to the border town of Katima Mulilo (where there is a short  spur section, also designated B8, crossing into Zambia)  and further on to the Botswana border at Ngoma. The section from Otavi to Katima Mulilo forms part of the Walvis Bay-Ndola-Lubumbashi Development Road.

Populated places

from west to east
 Otavi
 Kombat
 Grootfontein
 Rundu
 Ndiyona
 Divundu
 Kongola
 Katima Mulilo
 Ngoma

See also 
 Trans-Caprivi Highway
 Trans-African Highway network

References

Roads in Namibia